The teams competing in Group 10 of the 2013 UEFA European Under-21 Championship qualifying competition were Austria, Bulgaria, Luxembourg, Netherlands, and Scotland.

Standings

Results and fixtures

Goalscorers
8 goals

 Género Zeefuik
 Jordan Rhodes

4 goals
 Andreas Weimann

3 goals

 Deni Alar
 Raphael Holzhauser
 Leroy Fer

2 goals

 Radoslav Kirilov
 Georgi Milanov
 Momchil Tsvetanov
 Goncalo Almeida
 Georginio Wijnaldum
 Tony Watt

1 goal

 Christopher Dibon
 Christopher Drazan
 Michael Gregoritsch
 Tobias Kainz 
 Marcel Sabitzer
 Rosen Kolev
 Georgi Kostadinov
 Tomislav Kostadinov
 Aleksandar Tonev
 Laurent Jans
 Massimo Martino
 Chris Philipps
 David Turpel
 Leandro Bacuna
 Nacer Barazite
 Jordy Clasie
 Adam Maher
 Bram Nuytinck
 Rick ten Voorde
 Marco van Ginkel
 Ricky van Haaren
 Stuart Armstrong
 Leigh Griffiths
 Paul Hanlon
 Alex MacDonald
 Johnny Russell
 David Wotherspoon

References

External links
Standings and fixtures at UEFA.com

Group 10